Jiří Lehečka (born 8 November 2001) is a Czech professional tennis player. Lehečka has a career high ATP singles ranking of World No. 37 achieved on 6 February 2023. He also has a career high ATP doubles ranking of World No. 214 achieved on 7 March 2022. Lehečka has a career high ITF junior combined ranking of No. 10 achieved on 11 March 2019. He is currently the No. 1 Czech tennis player in singles.

Early life 
Jiří Lehečka is the son of two athletes. His father was a swimmer, and his mother was a track and field star. He has long enjoyed skiing, cycling and swimming and remembers first touching a tennis racquet at three. His grandmother, who competed on a national level, taught his older sister the game, so naturally he wanted to play. When Lehečka was young, he admired Tomáš Berdych and Radek Štěpánek.

Professional career

2021: 2 singles & 3 doubles Challenger titles, Singles top 150, Doubles top 250
Lehečka won two ATP Challenger singles titles, one ATP Challenger doubles title with Vít Kopřiva and two with Zdeněk Kolář.

2022: Major debut, first match win & semifinal on ATP debut, Top 60 
Lehečka qualified for the main draw of the 2022 Australian Open, defeating Michael Mmoh, Max Purcell, and Dmitry Popko. He lost in the first round to the 26th seed Grigor Dimitrov in four sets.

At the 2022 ABN AMRO World Tennis Tournament in Rotterdam, he reached the second round as a qualifier, with a stunning upset over fifth seed Denis Shapovalov in straight sets in his first ATP Tour main-draw match. He went on to defeat Botic van de Zandschulp and Lorenzo Musetti to reach the semifinals on his ATP debut, where he was defeated in three sets by top seed Stefanos Tsitsipas. He became the lowest-ranked Rotterdam semifinalist since then-World No. 225 Omar Camporese in 1995. As a result he moved 42 positions up into the top 100 in the rankings at World No. 95 on 14 February 2022.

At the 2022 Serbia Open he qualified into the main draw but lost in the second round to second seed, World No. 8 and eventual champion Andrey Rublev.

At the 2022 BMW Open he qualified into the main draw again defeating Alejandro Tabilo 6–4, 7–6(7–3) in the final round of qualifying. He lost to wildcard and eventual champion Holger Rune in the first round.

He made his debut at the 2022 French Open and the 2022 Wimbledon Championships where he lost in the first round in both.

At the 2022 Generali Open Kitzbühel he reached the quarterfinals defeating Thiago Monteiro and eight seed João Sousa before losing to third seed Roberto Bautista Agut in a tight three sets match.

He made his debut at US Open, completing all Major debuts in one season, where he lost to Cristian Garín.

He qualified for the 2022 Next Generation ATP Finals and reached the semifinals defeating Matteo Arnaldi. He defeated Dominic Stricker in the semifinal but lost to Brandon Nakashima in the final in straight sets.

2023: United Cup debut, Major first win, top-10 win & quarterfinal, top 40 
Lehečka began his season as the top-ranked Czech male player at the inaugural 2023 United Cup where he lost to Taylor Fritz 3–6 4–6 but defeated Alexander Zverev 6–4 6–2 in Zverev's first ATP match coming back from injury. Lehečka also played mixed doubles with Marie Bouzková.

He reached the 2023 Australian Open fourth round defeating eleventh seed Cameron Norrie taking his revenge after he was beaten by Norrie at the 2023 Auckland Open the previous week. Next he defeated sixth seed Félix Auger-Aliassime, his first top-10 win, to reach a Major quarterfinal for the first time in his career. As a result he moved more than 30 positions up into the top 40 at world No. 39 on 30 January 2023.
At the same tournament he also reached the third round in doubles on his debut at the event at this Major with partner Alex Molčan.

At the 2023 Qatar ExxonMobil Open he recorded his first top-5 win over top seed Andrey Rublev to reach the semifinals, having previously defeated qualifier Damir Dzumhur and Emil Ruusuvuori.

National representation 
Lehečka represents the Czech Republic at the Davis Cup, where he has a W/L record of 0–2. He made his debut at the 2019 Davis Cup Qualifying Round against Robin Haase of the Netherlands.

Performance Timeline

Current through the 2023 Australian Open

Record against other players

Record against Top 10 players
Lehečka's record against players who have been ranked in the top 10, with those who are active in boldface. Only ATP Tour main draw matches are considered:

Record against players ranked 11-20

 Borna Ćorić 1–0
 Lorenzo Musetti 1–0
 Christian Garin 0–1
 Nick Kyrgios 0–1

*

Top 10 wins 
Lehečka has a  record against players who were, at the time the match was played, ranked in the top 10. 

:* '''

ATP Next Generation finals

Singles: 1 (1 runner-up)

ATP Challenger and ITF Futures/World Tennis Tour Finals

Singles: 13 (6–7)

Doubles: 6 (4–2)

Junior Grand Slam finals

Doubles: 1 (1 title)

Davis Cup

Participations: (0–2)

   indicates the outcome of the Davis Cup match followed by the score, date, place of event, the zonal classification and its phase, and the court surface.

References

External links

 
 
 

2001 births
Living people
Czech male tennis players
Sportspeople from Mladá Boleslav
Grand Slam (tennis) champions in boys' doubles
Wimbledon junior champions
21st-century Czech people